Robert René Gaudreau (born March 8, 1944) is an American former ice hockey defenseman and Olympian.

Gaudreau played with Team USA at the 1968 Winter Olympics held in Grenoble, France. He previously played for the Brown Bears at Brown University. He is the father of former NHL player, Rob Gaudreau.

Awards and honors

References

External links

1944 births
Living people
Ice hockey players at the 1968 Winter Olympics
Olympic ice hockey players of the United States
American men's ice hockey defensemen
AHCA Division I men's ice hockey All-Americans